Pasynkovo is a rural locality (a village) in Cherkutinskoye Rural Settlement, Sobinsky District, Vladimir Oblast, Russia. The population was 1 as of 2010.

Geography 
Pasynkovo is located 37 km northwest of Sobinka (the district's administrative centre) by road. Volkovo is the nearest rural locality.

References 

Rural localities in Sobinsky District